The 2018–19 NIFL Championship was the third season of the NIFL Championship since gaining senior status. It is the second-tier of the Northern Ireland Football League - the national football league in Northern Ireland.

Teams
The 2018–19 NIFL Championship was contested by 12 teams. Institute were champions in the previous season, and were promoted to the 2018–19 NIFL Premiership. They were replaced by the bottom team in last season's Premiership, Ballinamallard United. Runners-up Newry City won 6–3 on aggregate in the promotion play-off against Carrick Rangers, also achieving promotion to the Premiership for this season and relegating Carrick Rangers to the Championship.

The bottom team from the previous season, Lurgan Celtic, were relegated to the third-tier NIFL Premier Intermediate League. They were replaced by Dundela, winners of the Premier Intermediate League. The eleventh-placed team from the previous season, Dergview, remained in the Championship this season, after defeating the NIFL Premier Intermediate League runners-up Queen's University 4–1 on aggregate in the relegation play-off.

Stadia and locations

League table

Results

Matches 1–22
During matches 1–22 each team played every other team twice (home and away).

Matches 23–32
During matches 23–32 each team plays every other team in their half of the table twice (home and away).

Top six

Bottom six

Play-offs

NIFL Premiership play-offs
See: 2018–19 NIFL Premiership

NIFL Championship play-off
The eleventh-placed team from the Championship, PSNI, faced Annagh United, the runners-up from the 2018–19 Premier Intermediate League over two legs for one spot in the 2019–20 NIFL Championship. PSNI won 5–3 on aggregate to retain their place in the Championship for next season. Annagh United remained in the Premier Intermediate League.

PSNI won 5–3 on aggregate and retained their Championship status for the 2019–20 season.

References

External links

NIFL Championship seasons
Northern Ireland
2018–19 in Northern Ireland association football